Raecce Ellington is an English footballer who plays as a forward for 1874 Northwich. Raeece started his career at Bradford City, where he made his senior debut on 9 October 2018, in the EFL Trophy. In 2021 he played for Stockport Town whilst studying.

References

2000 births
Living people
English footballers
Association football forwards
Bradford City A.F.C. players
Stockport Town F.C. players
1874 Northwich F.C. players